Daniel Shank (born May 12, 1967) is a Canadian former professional ice hockey player who played in the National Hockey League.

After playing four seasons in the Quebec Major Junior Hockey League, Shank made his professional debut with the Adirondack Red Wings of the American Hockey League in the 1988–89 season.  After scoring just 25 points in the AHL regular season, he tallied 19 in the Calder Cup playoffs, including 11 goals, helping the Red Wings win the AHL championship.

He made his NHL debut with Detroit the next season, scoring 24 points in 57 games.  After appearing in just seven NHL games in the 1990–91 season, though, and beginning the 1991–92 season back in Adirondack, Shank was traded to the Hartford Whalers in exchange for Chris Tancill.  He appeared in 13 regular season and 5 playoff games for the Whalers that season.

Shank then began an extensive International Hockey League career, spending the next six seasons there exclusively.  He had much scoring success in the IHL, scoring 39 goals with the San Diego Gulls in 1992–93, 48 with the Minnesota Moose and Detroit Vipers in 1994–95, 50 with the Detroit Vipers and Las Vegas Thunder in 1995–96, and 39 with the San Antonio Dragons in 1997–98.

During his IHL days, Shank also played in Roller Hockey International, scoring 325 points in five seasons.

After appearing in nine games with the Frankfurt Lions of the Deutsche Eishockey Liga in 1998–99, Shank returned to North America to play in lower minor leagues.  He spent three seasons in the West Coast Hockey League, two in the Quebec Semi-Pro Hockey League, and, most recently, the 2005–06 season in the LNAH with the Verdun Dragons, where he played four games in his last professional action.

Shank also was the head coach of the Central Hockey League's Border City Bandits for part of the 2000-01 season, with his team winning just one of the 13 games for which he was behind the bench.

In his NHL career, Shank appeared in 77 games.  He scored 13 goals and added 14 assists.  He also played in five games for Hartford during the 1992 Stanley Cup Playoffs, recording no points.

In his IHL career, Shank appeared in 470 games.  He scored 240 goals and added 282 assists.

Career statistics

External links

Daniel Shank Dot Com

1967 births
Adirondack Red Wings players
Anaheim Bullfrogs players
Anglophone Quebec people
Chicoutimi Saguenéens (QMJHL) players
Detroit Red Wings players
Detroit Vipers players
Frankfurt Lions players
Hartford Whalers players
Hull Olympiques players
Las Vegas Thunder players
Laval Titan players
Living people
Longueuil Chevaliers players
Orlando Jackals players
Phoenix Cobras players
Phoenix Roadrunners (IHL) players
San Antonio Dragons players
San Diego Barracudas players
San Diego Gulls (IHL) players
San Diego Gulls (WCHL) players
Shawinigan Cataractes players
Springfield Indians players
Ice hockey people from Montreal
Undrafted National Hockey League players
Canadian ice hockey right wingers